The  is a Japanese international school in Voluntari, Ilfov County, Romania, near Bucharest. Previously it was located in Bucharest proper. The school is affiliated with the Embassy of Japan in Bucharest.

History
In December 1975 the Japanese community of Bucharest requested that a Japanese school open in their community. In 1977 the Japanese government granted this licence.

The school opened in 1979. The school receives funds from tuition and the Japanese government. As of 2005 the monthly school fee was 270 euros. In order for a student to be eligible to attend, he/she has to speak Japanese.

Student body
In 1986 there were 32 students. As of 2005 the school had 21 students. In 2006 there were 20 students, with a class average of 3 per class.

The parents of students tend to be company employees, Japanese restaurant owners, diplomats, and teachers. After the 9th grade students tend to study in international schools in Romania or travel outside of Romania to get a high school education. Minoru Nishida, the school's director, stated in 2005 that the student body fluctuated depending on business opportunities in Romania; in 1986 there was an influx of Japanese businesspeople in Romania and therefore the student body had increased.

Recreation
This school holds an autumn festival.

Notes

Further reading
 Yoshikawa, Chiho (吉川 千穗 Yoshikawa Chiho; 前ブカレスト日本人学校　北海道阿寒郡鶴居村立下幌呂小学校). "ルーマニアの特色や地域素材を生かした教育活動の工夫　―中学部音楽科の授業実践より―." (Archive) 在外教育施設における指導実践記録 32, 45–48, 2009-10-12. Tokyo Gakugei University. See profile at CiNii.

External links

 Japanese School in Bucharest 
   

International schools in Romania
Bucharest
Schools in Ilfov County
1979 establishments in Romania
Educational institutions established in 1979